The All India Muslim League is a political party that was formed in the Indian state of Tamil Nadu in 2002. The founding party president is M. Rafiq Ahmad. The party supported the All India Anna Dravida Munnetra Kazhagam and the National Democratic Alliance.

References

Political parties in Tamil Nadu
Political parties established in 2002
2002 establishments in Tamil Nadu